The following elections occurred between the years 1001 and 1700.

1000s 

1002 German royal election
1024 German royal election
1028 Imperial election
1051 Imperial election
1061 papal election
1073 papal election
1075 Imperial election
1077 Imperial election
1081 Imperial election
1086 papal election
1088 papal election
1098 Imperial election
1099 papal election

1100s 
1118 papal election
1119 papal election
1124 papal election
1125 German royal election
1127 Imperial election
1130 papal election
1138 Imperial election
1143 papal election
1144 papal election
1145 papal election
1147 Imperial election
1152 Imperial election
1153 papal election
1154 papal election
1159 papal election
1169 Imperial election
1181 papal election
1185 papal election
October 1187 papal election
December 1187 papal election
1191 papal election
1196 Imperial election
1198 papal election
March 1198 Imperial election
June 1198 Imperial election

1200s 
1216 papal election
 1227 papal election
1241 papal election
1243 papal election
1254 papal election
1261 papal election
1264–1265 papal election
Simon de Montfort's Parliament, January 1265
 1268–1271 papal election
 January 1276 papal conclave
July 1276 papal conclave
 September 1276 papal election
 1277 papal election
 1280–1281 papal election
 1285 papal election
 1287–1288 papal election
 1292–1294 papal election
 1294 papal conclave

1300s 

 1303 papal conclave
1304-1305 papal conclave
 1314–1316 papal conclave
1334 papal conclave
 1342 papal conclave
 1352 papal conclave
1362 papal conclave
 1370 papal conclave
 1378 papal conclave
 1389 papal conclave

1400s 
 1404 papal conclave
 1406 papal conclave
 (1409) Council of Pisa
 (1414—1418) Council of Constance
 1431 papal conclave
1447 papal conclave
 (1431—1449) Council of Florence
1455 papal conclave
 1458 papal conclave
 1464 papal conclave
1471 papal conclave
1484 papal conclave
 1492 papal conclave

1500s 
 September 1503 papal conclave
October 1503 papal conclave
1513 papal conclave
1521–1522 papal conclave
1523 papal conclave
(1534) Election of Christian III
 1534 papal conclave
 1549–1550 papal conclave
 April 1555 papal conclave
 May 1555 papal conclave
1559 papal conclave
1565–1566 papal conclave
 1571 Haverfordwest election
 1572 papal conclave
1585 papal conclave
 September 1590 papal conclave
 October–December 1590 papal conclave
1591 papal conclave
 1592 papal conclave

1600s 

 March–April 1605 papal conclave
May 1605 papal conclave
1621 papal conclave
1623 papal conclave
1644 papal conclave
1655 papal conclave
1661 English general election
 1667 papal conclave
 1669–1670 papal conclave
1676 papal conclave
March 1679 English general election
October 1679 English general election
1681 English general election
1685 English general election
1689 English general election
1689 papal conclave
1691 papal conclave
1690 English general election
1695 English general election
1698 English general election

1700 

 1700 papal conclave

1001–1700